Daniel Higgins (born 8 April 1998) is a Scottish footballer who plays for Stenhousemuir. Higgins has previously played for Dundee, Kilmarnock, Airdrieonians, Stranraer, Cove Rangers and East Fife.

Playing career
Higgins made his professional debut for Dundee on 8 April 2017, in a 1–0 defeat away to Heart of Midlothian

Higgins signed for Kilmarnock on 23 June 2017. He was loaned to League One club Airdrieonians on 31 January 2018.

In September 2018, he joined Stranraer on loan.

On 16 July 2019, Higgins signed for newly promoted Scottish League Two club Cove Rangers.

Higgins moved to East Fife in August 2021.

Career statistics

References

1998 births
Living people
Scottish footballers
Scottish Professional Football League players
Celtic F.C. players
Dundee F.C. players
Kilmarnock F.C. players
Airdrieonians F.C. players
Association football midfielders
Stranraer F.C. players
Cove Rangers F.C. players
East Fife F.C. players
Stenhousemuir F.C. players